Siveleh (also romanized as Sīveleh and Sivaleh) is a small village in Pachehlak-e Gharbi Rural District, in the Central District of Azna County, Lorestan Province, Iran. At the 2006 census, its population was 212, in 43 families.

References 

Towns and villages in Azna County